Malichus II (Nabataean Aramaic:  Malīḵū or  Malīḵūʾ) was ruler of Nabatea from 40 to 70 AD.

Malichus' reign is sometimes perceived as a period of declining Nabataean power, but this view depends in part on Nabataea having controlled Damascus in the period 34–40. The Romans had, however, diverted the routes of spice and perfume cargo shipments to Egypt. Rome was very powerful, so Malichus cooperated. In 66, a Jewish revolt occurred in Judaea. Malichus sent 5,000 cavalry and 1,000 infantry to help the Emperor Titus crush the rebellion.

Malichus II died in AD 70, and was succeeded by his son, Rabbel II Soter, initially under the regency of his widowed queen Šagīlat II.

See also
List of rulers of Nabatea

Notes

References
Jane Taylor: Petra And the Lost Kingdom of the Nabataeans. I. B. Tauris 2001, p. 73
Maria Giulia Amadasi, Eugenia Equini Schneider: Petra. University of Chicago Press 2002, p. 40, 94, 166, 168, 170

1st-century Nabataean monarchs
Roman client rulers
70 deaths